Arangannal was an Indian politician and former Member of the Legislative Assembly of Tamil Nadu. He was elected to the Tamil Nadu legislative assembly from Mylapore constituency as a Dravida Munnetra Kazhagam candidate in 1962, and 1967 elections. He was elected  from Egmore constituency as a Dravida Munnetra Kazhagam candidate in 1971 election.

References 

Dravida Munnetra Kazhagam politicians
Year of birth missing
Madras MLAs 1962–1967
Tamil Nadu MLAs 1967–1972
Tamil Nadu MLAs 1971–1976